Parsvanath Jain Temple – I is located in Digambara Jain Temple precinct in Khandagiri, Bhubaneswar. It is a living temple. The temple is facing towards east. The enshrined deity is Parsvanath. This image is made of marble. This image measures 2.80 metres in height x 1.05 metres width. The image is flanked by two sculptural panels carved with two images in each panel.

Age
Temple belongs to 20th century.

Physical description
Surrounding: The temple is surrounded by Rushvanath temple in north at a distance of 1.70 metres, Parsvanath temple No-II in south-east at a distance of 3.30 metres, compound wall in west at a distance of 8.40 metres.
Orientation: The temple is facing towards east. 
Architectural features (Plan and Elevation): On plan, the temple Sanctum chamber measures 4.60 square metres with R.C.C. flat roof. 
Construction techniques: Dry masonry 
Style: Kalingan

References 

Buildings and structures in Bhubaneswar
Jain temples in Odisha
20th-century establishments in India
20th-century Jain temples
20th-century architecture in India